The 2012 Giro del Trentino was the 36th edition of the Giro del Trentino cycling stage race. It was held from 17–20 April 2011, and was rated as a 2.HC event on the 2012 UCI Europe Tour. It was won by 's rider Domenico Pozzovivo.

Tour stages

Stage 1
17 April 2012 – Riva del Garda to Arco,  (team time trial)

Stage 2
18 April 2012 – Mori to Sant'Orsola Terme,

Stage 3
19 April 2012 – Pergine to Brenzone,

Stage 4
20 April 2012 – Castelletto Di Brenzone to Passo Pordoi,

References

Giro del Trentino
Giro del Trentino
Tour of the Alps